is a Japanese short-track speed-skater.

Ito competed at the 2010 Winter Olympics for Japan. She finished third in her opening round race of the  1000 metres, failing to advance and placing 18th. She was also a member of the 3000 metre relay team, which finished third in the semifinals and fourth in the B Final, ending up seventh overall.

As of 2013, Ito has won one bronze medal at the World Championships, as a member of the Japanese relay team in 2013. Her best individual result is 9th, in the 2012 1500 metres.

As of 2013, Ito has ten ISU Short Track Speed Skating World Cup podium finishes, all as part of the Japanese relay team. Her best result is a silver medal, achieved three times.  Her best World Cup ranking is eighth, in the 1000 metres in 2011–12.

World Cup Podiums

References

1986 births
Living people
Japanese female short track speed skaters
Olympic short track speed skaters of Japan
Short track speed skaters at the 2010 Winter Olympics
Short track speed skaters at the 2014 Winter Olympics
Short track speed skaters at the 2018 Winter Olympics
Asian Games medalists in short track speed skating
Short track speed skaters at the 2007 Asian Winter Games
Short track speed skaters at the 2011 Asian Winter Games
Short track speed skaters at the 2017 Asian Winter Games
Medalists at the 2007 Asian Winter Games
Medalists at the 2017 Asian Winter Games
Asian Games silver medalists for Japan
Asian Games bronze medalists for Japan
People from Hamamatsu
World Short Track Speed Skating Championships medalists
21st-century Japanese women